Gouglersville is a census-designated place in Spring, Cumru, and Brecknock townships, Berks County, Pennsylvania, United States. As of the 2010 census, the population was 548 residents.

Demographics

References

Census-designated places in Berks County, Pennsylvania
Census-designated places in Pennsylvania